Bilaskhani Todi is a Hindustani classical raga. It is a blend of the ragas Asavari and Todi, and has a close affinity with Komal Rishabh Asavari.

Theory 
The Hindustani classical raga Bilaskhani Todi is an example of the flaws of the Bhatkhande thaat system because it is classified under the Bhairavi thaat based on the notes it uses, but it is actually a type of Todi, and permitting any Bhairavi during a performance kills the raga.

Arohana and avarohana 
 Arohana: Sa re ga Pa dha Sa
 Avarohana: re ni dha Ma ga re Sa

Vadi and samavadi 
 Vadi: dha
 Samavadi: ga

Organization and relationships 
Thaat: Bhairavi

Samay (Time) 
Morning, between 6 a.m. to 12 p.m.

Seasonality 
Certain ragas have seasonal associations.

Rasa 
Devotional, Bhakti

Historical information

Origins 
Legend has it that this raga was created by Bilas Khan, son of Miyan Tansen, after his father's death. It is said that while trying to sing Todi, his father's favorite raga, in the wake of his father, Bilas was so grief-stricken that he mixed up his notes. That gave birth to this raga, and that Tansen's corpse moved one hand in approval of the new melody. (There is a similar legend, differing only in detail, about Tansen's Todi.)

Important recordings 
 Amir Khan, Ragas Bilaskhani Todi and Abhogi, HMV/AIR LP (long-playing record), EMI-ECLP2765
 Nikhil Banerjee, Morning Ragas, Bombay 1965, LP record, Raga Records. (Audio CD released June 1996; iTunes 2000).
 Ravi Shankar, from the 1950s

Film songs

Tamil

References 
Bor, Joep (ed). Rao, Suvarnalata; der Meer, Wim van; Harvey, Jane (co-authors) The Raga Guide: A Survey of 74 Hindustani Ragas. Zenith Media, London: 1999.

External links 
 SRA on Samay and Ragas
 SRA on Ragas and Thaats
 Rajan Parrikar on Ragas
 Film Songs in Bilaskhani Todi

Tp